In mathematics, a join-semilattice (or upper semilattice) is a partially ordered set that has a join (a least upper bound) for any nonempty finite subset. Dually, a meet-semilattice (or lower semilattice) is a partially ordered set which has a meet (or greatest lower bound) for any nonempty finite subset. Every join-semilattice is a meet-semilattice in the inverse order and vice versa.

Semilattices can also be defined algebraically: join and meet are associative, commutative, idempotent binary operations, and any such operation induces a partial order (and the respective inverse order) such that the result of the operation for any two elements is the least upper bound (or greatest lower bound) of the elements with respect to this partial order. 

A lattice is a partially ordered set that is both a meet- and join-semilattice with respect to the same partial order. Algebraically, a lattice is a set with two associative, commutative idempotent binary operations linked by corresponding absorption laws.

Order-theoretic definition

A set  partially ordered by the binary relation  is a meet-semilattice if

Replacing "greatest lower bound" with "least upper bound" results in the dual concept of a join-semilattice. Meet and join are binary operations on  A simple induction argument shows that the existence of all possible pairwise suprema (infima), as per the definition, implies the existence of all non-empty finite suprema (infima).

A join-semilattice is bounded if it has a least element, the join of the empty set. Dually, a meet-semilattice is bounded if it has a greatest element, the meet of the empty set.

Other properties may be assumed; see the article on completeness in order theory for more discussion on this subject. That article also discusses how we may rephrase the above definition in terms of the existence of suitable Galois connections between related posets — an approach of special interest for category theoretic investigations of the concept.

Algebraic definition

 Associativity 
 Commutativity 
 Idempotency 

A meet-semilattice  is bounded if  includes an identity element 1 such that  for all  in  

If the symbol , called join, replaces  in the definition just given, the structure is called a join-semilattice. One can be ambivalent about the particular choice of symbol for the operation, and speak simply of semilattices.

A semilattice is a commutative, idempotent semigroup; i.e., a commutative band. A bounded semilattice is an idempotent commutative monoid.

A partial order is induced on a meet-semilattice by setting  whenever . For a join-semilattice, the order is induced by setting  whenever . In a bounded meet-semilattice, the identity 1 is the greatest element of  Similarly, an identity element in a join semilattice is a least element.

Connection between the two definitions 
An order theoretic meet-semilattice  gives rise to a binary operation  such that  is an algebraic meet-semilattice.

The relation  introduced in this way defines a partial ordering from which the binary operation  may be recovered. Conversely, the order induced by the algebraically defined semilattice  coincides with that induced by 

Hence the two definitions may be used interchangeably, depending on which one is more convenient for a particular purpose. A similar conclusion holds for join-semilattices and the dual ordering ≥.

Examples

Semilattices are employed to construct other order structures, or in conjunction with other completeness properties.
 A lattice is both a join- and a meet-semilattice. The interaction of these two semilattices via the absorption law is what truly distinguishes a lattice from a semilattice.
 The compact elements of an algebraic lattice, under the induced partial ordering, form a bounded join-semilattice.
 Any finite semilattice is bounded, by induction.
 A totally ordered set is a distributive lattice, hence in particular a meet-semilattice and join-semilattice: any two distinct elements have a greater and lesser one, which are their meet and join.
 A well-ordered set is further a bounded join-semilattice, as the set as a whole has a least element, hence it is bounded.
 The natural numbers , with their usual order  are a bounded join-semilattice, with least element 0, although they have no greatest element: they are the smallest infinite well-ordered set.
 Any single-rooted tree (with the single root as the least element) of height  is a (generally unbounded) meet-semilattice. Consider for example the set of finite words over some alphabet, ordered by the prefix order. It has a least element (the empty word), which is an annihilator element of the meet operation, but no greatest (identity) element.
 A Scott domain is a meet-semilattice.
 Membership in any set  can  be taken as a model of a semilattice with base set  because a semilattice captures the essence of set extensionality. Let  denote  &  Two sets differing only in one or both of the:
 Order in which their members are listed;
 Multiplicity of one or more members,
are in fact the same set. Commutativity and associativity of  assure (1), idempotence, (2). This semilattice is the free semilattice over   It is not bounded by  because a set is not a member of itself.
 Classical extensional mereology defines a join-semilattice, with join read as binary fusion. This semilattice is bounded from above by the world individual.
This semilattice is bounded, with the least element being the singleton partition .

Semilattice morphisms

The above algebraic definition of a semilattice suggests a notion of morphism between two semilattices.

Hence  is just a homomorphism of the two semigroups associated with each semilattice. If  and  both include a least element 0, then  should also be a monoid homomorphism, i.e. we additionally require that

 

In the order-theoretic formulation, these conditions just state that a homomorphism of join-semilattices is a function that preserves binary joins and least elements, if such there be.

Note that any semilattice homomorphism is necessarily monotone with respect to the associated ordering relation. For an explanation see the entry preservation of limits.

Equivalence with algebraic lattices

There is a well-known equivalence between the category  of join-semilattices with zero with -homomorphisms and the category  of algebraic lattices with compactness-preserving complete join-homomorphisms, as follows. With a join-semilattice  with zero, we associate its ideal lattice . This defines a functor . This defines a functor .

Distributive semilattices

Surprisingly, there is a notion of "distributivity" applicable to semilattices, even though distributivity conventionally requires the interaction of two binary operations. This notion requires but a single operation, and generalizes the distributivity condition for lattices. These definitions are justified by the fact that any distributive join-semilattice in which binary meets exist is a distributive lattice. See the entry distributivity (order theory).

A join-semilattice is distributive if and only if the lattice of its ideals (under inclusion) is distributive.

Complete semilattices

Nowadays, the term "complete semilattice" has no generally accepted meaning, and various mutually inconsistent definitions exist. If completeness is taken to require the existence of all infinite joins, or all infinite meets, whichever the case may be, as well as finite ones, this immediately leads to partial orders that are in fact complete lattices. For why the existence of all possible infinite joins entails the existence of all possible infinite meets (and vice versa), see the entry completeness (order theory).

Nevertheless, the literature on occasion still takes complete join- or meet-semilattices to be complete lattices. In this case, "completeness" denotes a restriction on the scope of the homomorphisms. Specifically, a complete join-semilattice requires that the homomorphisms preserve all joins, but contrary to the situation we find for completeness properties, this does not require that homomorphisms preserve all meets. On the other hand, we can conclude that every such mapping is the lower adjoint of some Galois connection. The corresponding (unique) upper adjoint will then be a homomorphism of complete meet-semilattices. This gives rise to a number of useful categorical dualities between the categories of all complete semilattices with morphisms preserving all meets or joins, respectively.

Another usage of "complete meet-semilattice" refers to a bounded complete cpo. A complete meet-semilattice in this sense is arguably the "most complete" meet-semilattice that is not necessarily a complete lattice. Indeed, a complete meet-semilattice has all non-empty meets (which is equivalent to being bounded complete) and all directed joins. If such a structure has also a greatest element (the meet of the empty set), it is also a complete lattice. Thus a complete semilattice turns out to be "a complete lattice possibly lacking a top". This definition is of interest specifically in domain theory, where bounded complete algebraic cpos are studied as Scott domains. Hence Scott domains have been called algebraic semilattices.

Cardinality-restricted notions of completeness for semilattices have been rarely considered in the literature.

Free semilattices

This section presupposes some knowledge of category theory. In various situations, free semilattices exist. For example, the forgetful functor from the category of join-semilattices (and their homomorphisms) to the category of sets (and functions) admits a left adjoint. Therefore, the free join-semilattice  over a set  is constructed by taking the collection of all non-empty finite subsets of  ordered by subset inclusion. The case of free meet-semilattices is dual, using the opposite subset inclusion as an ordering. For join-semilattices with bottom, we just add the empty set to the above collection of subsets.

In addition, semilattices often serve as generators for free objects within other categories. Notably, both the forgetful functors from the category of frames and frame-homomorphisms, and from the category of distributive lattices and lattice-homomorphisms, have a left adjoint.

See also

  − generalization of join semilattice

Notes

References

 
 

It is often the case that standard treatments of lattice theory define a semilattice, if that, and then say no more. See the references in the entries order theory and lattice theory. Moreover, there is no literature on semilattices of comparable magnitude to that on semigroups.

External links

 Jipsen's algebra structures page: Semilattices.

Lattice theory
Algebraic structures